Govindas Konthoujam Singh is an Indian politician of Manipur and member of the Bharatiya Janata Party. He was elected for the seventh time in a row as a member of the Manipur Legislative Assembly from Bishnupur constituency in Bishnupur District from the Bharatiya Janata Party in 2022 Manipur Legislative Assembly election. Singh is Minister for PWD, Department of Youth Affairs & Sports in Second N. Biren Singh ministry.

He joined Bharatiya Janata Party in presence of Sambit Patra and Chief Minister of Manipur N. Biren Singh after resigning from Indian National Congress. He was the chief whip of the Congress Legislature Party. Konthoujam was also the Manipur Pradesh Congress Committee President from December 2020 to July 2021.

References

Living people
Manipur MLAs 1995–2000
Manipur MLAs 2000–2002
Manipur MLAs 2002–2007
Manipur MLAs 2007–2012
Manipur MLAs 2012–2017
Manipur MLAs 2017–2022
Manipur politicians
Bharatiya Janata Party politicians from Manipur
Indian National Congress politicians from Manipur
People from Bishnupur district
1963 births
Manipur MLAs 2022–2027